Edgewater is a neighborhood in Miami, Florida, located north of Downtown and the Arts & Entertainment District, and south of Midtown and the Upper Eastside.  It is roughly bound by North 17th Street to the south, North 37th Street to the north, the Florida East Coast Railway and East First Avenue to the west and Biscayne Bay to the east.

Edgewater is primarily a residential neighborhood, with many historic early 20th century homes. The neighborhood has many high-rise residential towers to the east along Biscayne Bay, and historic homes elsewhere in the neighborhood. Since 2000, the area has grown in popularity, due to its proximity to Downtown and neighborhoods such as the Design District. Recent developments in the neighborhood have brought rapid urbanization to the area, with the construction of high-rise and mid-rise residential buildings, and more retail.

Demographics

As of 2000, Edgewater (Wynwood) had a population between 14,034 and 14,819 residents, with 6,221 households, and 2,987 families residing in the neighborhood. The median household income was $11,293.93. The racial makeup of the neighborhood was 58.51% Hispanic or Latino of any race, 17.51% Black or African American, 21.55% White (non-Hispanic), and 2.42% Other races (non-Hispanic). It shares demographics with Wynwood.

The ZIP codes for the Edgewater (Wynwood) include 33127, 33132, and 33137. As of 2000, there were 7,548 males and 6,486 females. The median age for males was 32.5 years old, while the median age for females was 32.3 years old. The average household size had 2.3 people, while the average family size was 3.2 members. The percentage of married-couple families (among all households) was 25.2%, while the percentage of married-couple families with children (among all households) was 10.9%, and the percentage of single-mother households (among all households) was 11.6%. 4.5% of the population was in other group homes. The percentage of never-married males 15 years old and over was 20.1%, while the percentage of never-married females 15 years old and over was 15.9%.

As of 2000, the percentage of people that speak English not well or not at all made up 25.1% of the population. The percentage of residents born in Florida was 28.0%, the percentage of people born in another U.S. state was 20.5%, and the percentage of native residents but born outside the U.S. was 7.0%, while the percentage of foreign born residents was 44.4%

Attractions  
Edgewater is located at the crossroads of luxury shopping, high-end restaurants and Miami's finest arts and culture. The Edgewater neighbourhood in Midtown consists mostly of high-rise residential towers and is home to the Adrienne Arsht Center for the Performing Arts, the Perez Art Museum Miami, the Patricia and Philip Frost Museum of Science. The project area is to the north, Winwood is to the west, and downtown is immediately to the south. Two major causeways surround the neighborhood.

Gallery

See also
Paramount Bay at Edgewater Square
1800 Club
Blue on the Bay
Wynwood

References

External links

Neighborhoods in Miami
Populated places on the Intracoastal Waterway in Florida